Legoland (trademark in uppercase as LEGOLAND) is a chain of family theme parks focusing on the construction toy system Lego. They are not fully owned by The Lego Group itself; rather, they are owned and operated by the British theme park company Merlin Entertainments, which shares a common owner (Kirkbi A/S) with The Lego Group.

The Legoland Billund Resort opened in Billund, Denmark in 1968, followed by the Legoland Windsor Resort in Windsor, England in 1996. Further parks opened in Germany, Japan, South Korea, Malaysia, the United Arab Emirates (Dubai), the United States (California, Florida, and New York), and a Legoland Water Park at Gardaland in Castelnuovo del Garda, Italy in 2021. Parks in Belgium, Beijing, Shanghai, Sichuan and Shenzhen are currently under construction.

Attractions
The parks are marketed to families with younger children (15 and under), and although the attractions include a number of roller coasters, the roller coasters are not as numerous or as extreme as those in other parks, and there is a greater emphasis on rides suitable for younger children.
Legoland parks are split into various areas, which are consistent among the chain's parks. For example, all six of the parks include a Lego miniland, a model village which includes models of landmarks and scenes from around the world, made from millions of genuine Lego bricks.

Educational elements

An important aspect of Legoland is education and learning.

Examples include:
Water flow channels in which participants can construct dams from Lego blocks to understand laminar and turbulent fluid flows
Interactive musical instruments, such as musical fountains, and the Aquatune hydraulophone, which is an underwater pipe organ in the shape of a giant Lego brick
A 45-minute Lego Mindstorms class for fun-based learning
Duplo Gardens (for smaller children)
Driving area (including attractions such as Driving school, Boating school, Ballooning school, Flying school, and Fire Academy)
My Town
Wild Woods
 Knights' Kingdom

The parks' rides are all Lego themed; many are made to appear as if they are built out of Lego bricks. They tend to be based on one particular line of Lego: for example, a popular ride at all six parks is the Dragon Coaster, which is loosely based on the Knights' Kingdom Lego sets. Another popular ride is the Driving school, in which children can drive small electric cars made to look like Lego cars around a small road network, after which they gain a mock driver's license.

Despite the commonality of the above-mentioned attractions, the exact set of rides varies between parks, although as with the Disney parks there is some overlap.

Parks

Europe

North America

Asia

Future parks 
 Europe 

Asia

Former parks 
Europe

See also
Legoland Discovery Centre

References

External links 

 
Miniature parks
Private equity portfolio companies
The Blackstone Group companies
Amusement park companies